This is a list of German language place names in Poland, now exonyms for towns and villages in the Warmia Region of the Warmian-Masurian Voivodeship.

Below are links to subpages with more detailed listings of the German language exonyms of towns and villages in  region  Warmia .

Barczewo Wartenburg
Biskupiec Bischofsburg
Bisztynek Bischofstein
Braniewo Braunsberg
Dobre Miasto Guttstadt
Frombork Frauenburg
Jeziorany Seeburg
Lidzbark Warmiński Heilsberg
Olsztyn Allenstein
Orneta Wormditt
Pieniężno Mehlsack

Sublists by counties

Braniewo County
Lidzbark Warmiński County
Olsztyn County
Olsztyn City

See also 
List of German exonyms for places in Poland
 GW
Warmia